The Similaun is a mountain in the Schnalskamm group of the Ötztal Alps. It is on the Austrian-Italian border. At 3,606 m, it is Austria's sixth highest summit. It was first ascended in 1834 by Josef Raffeiner and Theodor Kaserer. It is most famous for being the mountain on whose slopes Helmut Simon and Erika Simon discovered Ötzi the Iceman in 1991.

References

Mountains of Tyrol (state)
Mountains of South Tyrol
Mountains of the Alps
Alpine three-thousanders
Ötztal Alps
Austria–Italy border
International mountains of Europe